Magda Karina (born Magdalena Karina Talamantes Descalzó on July 27, 1966 in Mexico City, Mexico) is a Mexican actress.

Biography 
Karina was born on July 27, 1966 in Mexico City, Mexico. She is the daughter of actress and director Karina Duprez and granddaughter of also actress Magda Guzmán and theater director Julián Duprez. By the marriage of his mother with actor Carlos Ancira, he became his adopted daughter.

She began her acting career while still a child, debuting in theater at sixteen years old in theatrical performance El soldadito de plomo. On television she debuted in telenovela Déjame vivir on 1982.

In recent years, Magda Karina has used a new artistic name in some television works as Karina Ancira, adopting her stepfather's last name, Carlos Ancira.

Filmography

References

External links 
 
 

1966 births
Living people
Mexican telenovela actresses
Mexican television actresses
Mexican film actresses
Mexican stage actresses
Actresses from Mexico City
20th-century Mexican actresses
21st-century Mexican actresses
People from Mexico City